Nowy Staw is a town in Pomeranian Voivodeship in northern Poland.

Nowy Staw (meaning "New Pond") may also refer to:

 Nowy Staw, Lublin Voivodeship, a village in  Lublin Voivodeship (east Poland)
 Nowy Staw, Świętokrzyskie Voivodeship, a village in Świętokrzyskie Voivodeship (south-central Poland)

See also 
 Gmina Nowy Staw